Pearl Harbor Memorial Highway may refer to:

 Pearl Harbor Memorial Highway, designated along Interstate 10 in the rural areas of California, Arizona, New Mexico and Florida
 Pearl Harbor Memorial Expressway, designated along US-169 through Tulsa, Oklahoma
 Pearl Harbor/ Memorial Highway, designated along State Highway 77H in Norman, Moore, and Oklahoma City, Oklahoma
 Pearl Harbor Memorial Highway, part of Interstate 69 running through Shiawassee County, Michigan
 Pearl Harbor Memorial Highway, Interstate 65 through Johnson County, Indiana

See also
 Pearl Harbor Memorial Turnpike Extension in New Jersey
 the West Shore Expressway in New York, ceremonially designated the Pearl Harbor Memorial Expressway by Gov. George Pataki.
 Pearl Harbor Memorial Bridge (disambiguation)

References